Ashfield railway station  may refer to:

 Ashfield Halt railway station, Northern Ireland
 Ashfield railway station (Scotland)
 Ashfield railway station, Perth, in Western Australia
 Ashfield railway station, Sydney, New South Wales
 Kirkby-in-Ashfield railway station, Nottinghamshire